is a JR East railway station in the city of Daisen, Akita Prefecture, Japan.

Lines
Mineyoshikawa Station is served by the Ōu Main Line, and is located 265.4 km from the terminus of the line at Fukushima Station.

Station layout
Mineyoshikawa Station consists of a two opposed side platforms connected by a footbridge, although the platform next to the station building is now reserved for through traffic for the Akita Shinkansen. The station is staffed.

Platforms

History
It was elevated to a full station on June 21, 1930. The JGR became the Japan National Railways (JNR) after World War II. The station was absorbed into the JR East network upon the privatization of the JNR on April 1, 1987. A new station building was completed in February 2004.

Passenger statistics
In fiscal 2018, the station was used by an average of 67 passengers daily (boarding passengers only).

Surrounding area

References

External links

 JR East Station information 

Railway stations in Japan opened in 1930
Railway stations in Akita Prefecture
Ōu Main Line
Daisen, Akita